Federal Route 13 is a federal road in Negeri Sembilan, Malaysia. The  connects Juasseh in the west to Bahau in the east.

The Kilometre Zero is located at Bahau.

At most sections, the Federal Route 13 was built under the JKR R5 road standard, allowing maximum speed limit of up to 90 km/h.

List of junctions and towns

References

Malaysian Federal Roads